The 2008 Cyprus Women's Cup was the inaugural edition of the Cyprus Women's Cup, an invitational women's football tournament held annually in Cyprus. Six national teams, including five senior teams and one youth team, were invited: Canada, Netherlands, Japan, Russia, Scotland, and the United States U-20 team (the United States senior team competed in the concurrent 2008 Algarve Cup). Canada defeated the United States U-20 team in the final.

Format
The tournament consisted of a group stage held over three match days followed by a single day of classification matches to determine the final standings.

For the group stage, the six teams were split into two groups of three teams. Each group played a round-robin tournament with each team playing one match against each other team in its group. In addition, on each group stage match day, one team from each group did not have a round-robin group match; these two teams played an exhibition match that was not counted towards the group stage standings.

The classification day then had three matches: a first place match between the group winners, a third place match between the runners-up, and a fifth place match between the bottom teams.

Group stage

Group A

Group B

Exhibition Matches

Placement matches

Fifth place match

Third place match

Final

Champion

Goalscorers
5 goals
  Christine Sinclair

2 goals

  Yuki Nagasato
  Rumi Utsugi
  Karin Stevens
  Elena Morozova
  Olesya Truntaeva
  Michelle Enyeart
  Kelley O'Hara
  Brittney Steinbruch

1 goal

  Julie Armstrong
  Jonelle Filigno
  Kara Lang
  Michi Goto
  Shinobu Ohno
  Mizuho Sakaguchi
  Eriko Sato
  Nangila van Eyck
  Natalia Barbashina
  Natalia Mokshanova
  Alla Rogova
  Suzanne Grant
  Pauline Hamill
  Kim Little
  Joanne Love
  Hollie Thomson

References

2008
2008 in women's association football
2007–08 in Cypriot football